Crossover thrash (often abbreviated to crossover) is a fusion genre of thrash metal and hardcore punk. The genre lies on a continuum between heavy metal and hardcore punk. Other genres on the same continuum, such as metalcore and grindcore, may overlap with crossover thrash.

Terminological ambiguity 
The genre is often confused with thrashcore, which is essentially a faster hardcore punk rather than a more punk-oriented form of metal. Throughout the early and mid 1980s, the term "thrash" was often used as a synonym for hardcore punk (as in the New York Thrash compilation of 1982). The term "thrashcore" to distinguish acts of the genre from others was not coined until at least 1993. Many crossover bands, such as D.R.I., began as influential thrashcore bands. The "-core" suffix of "thrashcore" is sometimes used to distinguish it from crossover thrash and thrash metal, the latter of which is often referred to simply as "thrash", which in turn is rarely used to refer to crossover thrash or thrashcore. Thrashcore is occasionally used by the music press to refer to thrash metal-inflected metalcore.

History
Crossover thrash evolved when performers in metal began borrowing elements of hardcore punk's music. Void and their 1982 Split LP with fellow D.C. band The Faith are hailed as one of the earliest examples of hardcore/heavy metal crossover and their chaotic musical approach is often cited as particularly influential. Punk-based metal bands generally evolved into the genre by developing a more technically advanced approach than the average hardcore outfit (which focused on very fast tempos and very brief songs); these bands were  more metal-sounding and aggressive than traditional hardcore punk and thrashcore. The initial contact between punk rock and heavy metal involved a "fair amount of mutual loathing. Despite their shared devotion to speed, spite, shredded attire and stomping on distortion pedals, their relationship seemed, at first, unlikely."

While Motörhead explored punk in the late '70s, it was UK hardcore that drew "...inspiration from metal's volcanic heart" to create a "bludgeoning tonality and cataclysmic narratives" that "bridged the gulf" between metal and punk; the key band is "UK hardcore's most crucial band: Discharge", which from 1980 to 1983 "challenged prevailing notions of what punk was supposed to sound like, and in doing so revolutionized the prospects of metal."

Especially early on, crossover thrash had a strong affinity with skate punk, but gradually became more and more the province of metal audiences. The scene gestated at a Berkeley club called Ruthie's, in 1984. The term "metalcore" was originally used to refer to these crossover groups. 
As Steven Blush said,

Hardcore punk groups Corrosion of Conformity, D.R.I. and Suicidal Tendencies played alongside thrash metal groups like Megadeth, Anthrax, Metallica, Slayer, Exodus, Testament and Overkill. This scene influenced the skinhead wing of New York hardcore, including crossover groups such as Cro-Mags, Murphy's Law, Agnostic Front, and Warzone.

In 1984, New Jersey crossover group Hogan's Heroes was formed and played alongside thrash metal groups like Destruction, Death Angel, Forbidden, and Prong. In the October 1984 issue of Maximum Rocknroll, famed Metallica LP cover artist Brian "Pushead" Schroeder wrote "You ain't heard this! Blisters with speedcore franticness, mean with whining licks as it kicks into a maniac pace. Well organized melodies that cry out in terrorizing metallic thrash. While some bands are trying to be metal, English Dogs are just the dawning of speedcore!", referring to the EP To the End's of the Earth. Other prominent crossover thrash groups include Attitude Adjustment, Crumbsuckers, Cryptic Slaughter, Discharge, Municipal Waste, Nuclear Assault, Stormtroopers of Death, M.O.D., SSD, The Exploited & Leeway.

See also
 List of crossover thrash bands

References

Bibliography
 Blush, Steven and Petros, George (2001).  American Hardcore: A Tribal History. Los Angeles: Feral House. .
 Waksman, Steve (2009). This Ain't the Summer of Love: Conflict and Crossover in Heavy Metal and Punk. Berkeley, CA: University of California Press. .

20th-century music genres
Extreme metal
Hardcore punk genres
Heavy metal genres
Thrash metal
American rock music genres